Ursula Micaela Morata (Cartagena, Spain, 21 October 1628 – Alicante, Spain, 9 January 1703) was a nun, mystic, and founder of the convent of the Capuchin Poor Clares in Alicante, Spain.

Childhood
Born into a well-to-do family, Morata was the youngest of thirteen brothers and sisters. Her father, Marco Aurelio Morata e Iscaya, was an Italian knight from Savoy. Her mother, Juana Garibaldo, from Madrid, was also of Italian ancestry. They died within three days of each other in 1632, when Morata was three years old. She was left in the care of her elder sister, Sebastiana. When she was four years old, she had her first mystical experience during an attack of smallpox that brought her to the brink of death. In her own words,

Thus began her spiritual apprenticeship, in which she acquired the dominant ideas of the time as regards prayer, fasting and mortification, receiving through these practices other mystical experiences.

Thanks to her sister, she learned to read and to write, an uncommon practice at the time, especially for women.

Early years as a nun

In 1647, she took her religious vows in the convent of the Capuchin Poor Clares of Murcia, adopting the name Micaela.

When plague ravaged Murcia in 1648, Sister Ursula Micaela nursed the sick. In 1651 and 1653 the river Segura overflowed, forcing the community of nuns to abandon their convent and take refuge on Monte de los Ermitas. During this period, Sister Ursula Micaela experienced the dark night of the soul, a stage of spiritual crisis described by many mystics. In 1652, she was ordered by her confessor to write her autobiography.

Spiritual progress
In 1653, at the end of her dark night of the soul, she experienced transverberation of the heart in a manner similar to Saint Teresa of Ávila:

Sister Ursula Micaela had various supernatural experiences also found in other mystics: visions, locutions, miracles, extrasensory perception, etc. She was especially noted for bilocation, which even took her to other nations, and prophecy, which made her an oracle to whom people turned for advice, including Charles II of Spain and John of Austria the Younger, with both of whom she maintained a correspondence. 

In 1661, she was elected counselor and secretary of her religious community.

Convent in Alicante

In 1669, the first steps were taken to establish a convent of the Capuchin Poor Clares in the city of Alicante. The difficulties were many, and the foundation did not take place until 1672. The first residence was provisional, in a house not really appropriate for communitarian life. For that reason, work began on the construction of a convent and church, financed by donations from the people of Alicante and John of Austria the Younger, and under the protection of Charles II. The work was not completed until 1682. The convent received the title of Triumphs of the Blessed Sacrament, a name inspired by one of Sister Ursula's visions.

Sister Ursula Micaela held the office of vicaress (vicaria or deputy abbess) of the convent until 1699, when she was elected abbess, an office she held until her death. These later experiences are not recorded in her Autobiography, since she left off writing it in 1684.

Death and cause for beatification
After two years of painful illness, she died on 9 January 1703, at the age of 75. The fame of her sanctity and the social prestige she had acquired resulted in her body lying in state in the church for six days. The body remained incorrupt, warm and supple, for which reason it was not interred. In 1742, Juan Elías Gómez de Terán, Bishop of Orihuela, finding it still intact, ordered that it be placed in a coffer without being buried. Thus the body has been conserved until the present time, still remaining incorrupt and supple.

Sister Ursula Micaela's reputation for sanctity led José de la Torre y Orumbella, Bishop of Orihuela-Alicante, to initiate an examination of her life and virtues in 1703 with a view to beatification. As a result of fires in the archives during the War of the Spanish Succession and the Spanish Civil War, the resulting documents were lost. However, her autobiography, 24 letters, and some other testimonies regarding her life survive. A diocesan inquiry for her beatification was opened by Rafael Palmero Ramos, Bishop of Orihuela-Alicante, on 11 October 2006 and concluded on 11 June 2009.

Bibliography
Memorias de una monja del Siglo XVII: autobiografía de la Madre Úrsula Micaela Morata, edited by Vicente Benjamin Piquer Garcés. Alicante: Hermanas Clarisas Capuchinas, 1999.

References

1628 births
1703 deaths
18th-century venerated Christians
17th-century Spanish women writers
18th-century Spanish women writers
17th-century Spanish writers
18th-century Spanish writers
17th-century Spanish nuns
18th-century Christian mystics
17th-century Christian mystics
Roman Catholic mystics
Christian writers
Capuchin Poor Clares
People from Cartagena, Spain
Spanish spiritual writers
Venerated Catholics